The 2022 LEC season is the fourth year of the League of Legends European Championship (LEC), a professional esports league for the MOBA PC game League of Legends, following its rebranding in late 2018.

Spring

Rosters 
Team BDS acquired the LEC spot of FC Schalke 04 for €26.5m at the conclusion of the 2021 season. This is also the final LEC season for Rogue, as they will merge with KOI for the 2023 season.

Regular season

Awards

Summer

Rosters

Regular season

Championship Points for playoffs seeding

Playoffs

References 

League of Legends
League of Legends European Championship seasons
2022 multiplayer online battle arena tournaments